Dániel Zsiga-Kárpát (Budapest, 1 June 1979) Hungarian writer, politician, member of Hungarian National Assembly and vice-president of Jobbik.

Early life 
He published seven books in Hungarian.

Political career 
He wrote the environment programme of Jobbik. Since 2010 he is a member of Hungarian National Assembly. On 25 January 2020, he was elected for vice-president of Jobbik.

References 

1979 births
Living people
Politicians from Budapest
Jobbik politicians
Hungarian economists
Members of the National Assembly of Hungary (2010–2014)
Members of the National Assembly of Hungary (2014–2018)
Members of the National Assembly of Hungary (2018–2022)
Members of the National Assembly of Hungary (2022–2026)
Writers from Budapest